Joes Valley Dam (National ID # UT10124) is a dam in Emery County, Utah.

The earthen dam was constructed between 1963 and 1965 by the United States Bureau of Reclamation, with a height of 192 feet and 750 feet long at its crest.  It impounds Seely Creek for irrigation and municipal water supply.  The dam is owned by the Bureau and operated by the local Emery Water Conservancy District as part of the Emery County Project, which also includes Huntington North Dam.

The reservoir it creates, Joes Valley Reservoir, has a water surface of about two square miles and a maximum capacity of 54,920 acre-feet.  Recreation includes fishing, hunting, boating, camping and hiking.  The site is surrounded by the Manti-La Sal National Forest.

References 

Dams in Utah
Reservoirs in Utah
United States Bureau of Reclamation dams
Buildings and structures in Emery County, Utah
Dams completed in 1965
Dams in the Green River (Colorado River tributary) basin
Lakes of Emery County, Utah
1965 establishments in Utah